The 1917 Primera División was the sixth season of top-flight Peruvian football. A total of 13 teams competed in the league, The champion was Sport Juan Bielovucic.

League table

Standings

Title

External links
Peruvian Championship 
Peruvian Football League News 
La Liga Peruana de Football 

Peru
1917
1917 in Peruvian football